Heilpern is a variation of the Jewish surname Heilprin and may refer to:
 David Heilpern, Australian lawyer and author
 Herbert Heilpern, soccer (football) player
 John Heilpern, English author
 Jeremy Heilpern, Advertising executive and speaker

Jewish surnames
Yiddish-language surnames